Pedro Ernesto do Rego Baptista, or simply "Pedro Ernesto" as he would later be known, was a successful medical surgeon who became mayor of Rio de Janeiro in mid-1931. His two terms were from September 30, 1931, until October 2, 1934; and from April 7, 1935, until April 4, 1936.

Biography
Pedro Ernesto would later be known as the first Populist Brazilian politician. His victory in the elections for mayor was partly due to the backing of then-president of Brazil, Getúlio Vargas. During his term in office, he made several social and populist reforms in the fields of health care, education, and indigenous culture (to his credit stands the revival of the Samba).

He quickly became the most popular politician in Brazil, and was even considered as a suitable candidate for the future presidential elections of 1938.

In 1936, however, Ernesto was charged with participation in a communist conspiracy against the government, and was arrested. He spent the next few years defending himself against charges of treason, and was eventually absolved. By then, however, Vargas had already launched his autocratic "New State" (Estado Novo), erasing the possibility of democratic elections.

Pedro Ernesto Medal
In October 1980, the Municipal Chamber of Rio de Janeiro, whose building is called "Pedro Ernesto Palace", instituted a medal with his name, considered the maximum commendation of the municipality.

It was severely questioned in 2006, after the ex-deputy Roberto Jefferson, confessed defendant and impeached for participating in the "mensalão scandal", was decorated with it by his own daughter, councilor Cristiane Brasil. The cartoonist "Jaguar" returned his medal, given eight years earlier by the then councilman Chico Alencar.

References

Bibliography
 Michael L. Conniff, “Brazil’s Populist Republic and Beyond”, in Conniff (ed.), Populism in Latin America

External links 
 PRISÃO DE PEDRO ERNESTO

Brazilian surgeons
Mayors of Rio de Janeiro (city)
1884 births
1942 deaths